Süyümbike is a common Turkish given name. The name is produced by using two Turkish words: Süyüm and Büke (origin of Bike). In Turkish, "Süyüm" means lovely and "Büke" means queen and/or woman. Therefore, it means lovely queen or lovely woman

Real People

 Süyümbike of Kazan, the last queen and the last ruler of Khanate of Kazan.
 Süyümbike Güvenç, photograph artist.

Places

 Süyümbike Tower, symbol of Kazan named after Süyümbike of Kazan.

Turkish feminine given names